This partial list of city nicknames in Oregon compiles the aliases, sobriquets and slogans that cities in Oregon are known by (or have been known by historically), officially and unofficially, to municipal governments, local people, outsiders or their tourism boards or chambers of commerce. City nicknames can help in establishing a civic identity, helping outsiders recognize a community or attracting people to a community because of its nickname; promote civic pride; and build community unity. Nicknames and slogans that successfully create a new community "ideology or myth" are also believed to have economic value. Their economic value is difficult to measure, but there are anecdotal reports of cities that have achieved substantial economic benefits by "branding" themselves by adopting new slogans.

Some unofficial nicknames are positive, while others are derisive. Many of the unofficial nicknames listed here have been in use for a long time or have gained wide currency.
Albany – Grass Seed Capital of the WorldAh-choo! Allergy season is here, and students are starting to feel the itch , by Trevor Davis, Oregon Daily Emerald, May 3, 2007. "Grass seed production in Linn County, known as the 'Grass Seed Capital of the World,' contributes to allergy problems in  
Eugene."
Amity – Where Friendship Begins
Brookings – Where Flowers Meet the Sea
Carlton – A Great Little Town
Columbia City – City of Beauty and Livability
Cornelius – Oregon's Family Town
Cottage Grove – Covered Bridge Capital of Oregon
Dayton – Rich In History . . . Envisioning Our Future
Depoe Bay
Whale Watching Capital of the Oregon Coast
The World's Smallest Harbor
Eugene
The Emerald City
Tracktown, USATrack Town U.S.A. is back, The Oregonian, June 26, 2008: "As it prepares to stage its first U.S. Olympic Track and Field Trials in 28 years, Eugene seems to be channeling some of the fearless spirit of the legendary Steve Prefontaine.... Eugene aims for nothing less than cementing its place in history as Track Town U.S.A."
Forest Grove – A Place Where Families and Businesses Thrive
Garibaldi – Oregon's Authentic Fishing Village
Grants Pass – Where the Rogue River Runs
Keizer – Iris Capital of the World
Klamath Falls – Oregon's City of Sunshine
La Grande – The Hub of Northeast Oregon
Lakeview – Tallest Town in Oregon
Lebanon – It's Easier From Here
Milton-Freewater – Muddy Frogwater Country
Milwaukie – The Dogwood City of the West
Molalla – Home of the Buckaroo Rodeo
Newberg – A Great Place to Grow
Newport – The Dungeness Crab Capital of the World
North Plains – City to the Sunset
Nyssa
Gateway to the Oregon TrailNyssa, Oregon Chamber of Commerce website, accessed September 1, 2012
Thunderegg Capital of the World
Oakridge
The Center of Oregon Recreation
Mountain Biking Capital of the Northwest
Ontario – Where Oregon Begins
 Phoenix – The Other Phoenix
 Portland 
 Bridgetown
Rip City
 Rose CityQueen City, Time (magazine), January 30, 1928, accessed April 13, 2007. or City of Roses
 Stumptown
Roseburg – Timber Capital of the Nation
Salem – The Cherry City
Sandy – Gateway to Mount Hood
Silverton – Oregon's Garden City
Springfield – Proud History, Bright Future
Stayton – Gateway to the Santiam Canyon
Sweet Home ‐  'Gateway to the Santiam Playground' - 'Sugar City'
 Talent – Our name speaks for itself
Tigard – A Place to Call Home
Waldport – Where the Forest Meets the Sea
Yamhill – A Small Taste of Oregon

See also
List of city nicknames in the United States

References

Oregon

City nicknames
City nicknames